Gorodovikovsky (masculine), Gorodovikovskaya (feminine), or Gorodovikovskoye (neuter) may refer to:
Gorodovikovsky District, a district of the Republic of Kalmykia, Russia
Gorodovikovskoye Urban Settlement, a municipal formation which the Town of Gorodovikovsk in Gorodovikovsky District of the Republic of Kalmykia, Russia is incorporated as